The Church on Blood in Honour of All Saints Resplendent in the Russian Land is a Russian Orthodox church in Yekaterinburg. Being built on the site of the Ipatiev House where Nicholas II, the last Emperor of Russia, and his family, along with members of the household, were executed by the Bolsheviks during the Russian Civil War, the church commemorates the Romanov sainthood.

Site history

Ipatiev House 

The Ipatiev House, built in the 1880s, was a spacious and modern residence owned by Nicholas Ipatiev. The Ural Soviet gave him two days' notice to leave. Once the building was vacated, the Soviet built high wooden walls around the house. First to arrive among the Romanovs were Nicholas, Alexandra Feodorovna and their daughter Maria. Later, they would be joined by Olga, Tatiana, Anastasia and Alexei. The Romanovs would be held prisoner in their final residence for 78 days. In 1974, the mansion was designated a "national monument"; but three years later on September 22, 1977, a team, under orders from the Soviet government and with the direction of Boris Yeltsin, demolished the house.

Romanov execution

After the February Revolution, the former Tsar and his family were taken captive and held as prisoners during the Russian Civil War. Tsar Nicholas and his family were at first kept at the Alexander Palace at Tsarskoe Selo outside St. Petersburg. Alexander Kerensky, leader of the provisional government moved them to the former Governor's mansion in Tobolsk. Later they were transferred to the Ipatiev House in Yekaterinburg.

With the advance of the Czechoslovak Legion (fighting with the White Army against Bolsheviks) towards Yekaterinburg, fears of a potential attempt to liberate them grew, and the local Bolshevik leaders, after consulting with the leadership in Moscow, decided to kill the family. In the early hours of July 17, 1918, the Tsar Nicholas Alexandrovich, Tsarina Alexandra Feodorovna, Grand Duchess Olga, Grand Duchess Tatiana, Grand Duchess Maria, Grand Duchess Anastasia and Tsarevich Alexei—were taken to the basement of the Ipatiev House and were murdered by being shot and bayoneted. Czechoslovak Legions captured the city less than a week later.

The church

On , the Sverdlovsk Soviet handed the plot to the Russian Orthodox Church for construction of a memorial chapel. After the former Tsar and his family's canonisation as Passion Bearers, the Church planned to build an impressive memorial complex dedicated to the Romanov family. A state commission was gathered and architectural as well as funding plans were developed. Construction began in 2000.

The completed complex comprises two churches, a belfry, a patriarchal annex, and a museum dedicated to the former imperial family; the altar of the main church is directly over the site of the Romanovs' execution.

On , 85 years after the execution of the former imperial family, the main church was consecrated by Metropolitan bishop Yuvenaly, delegated by Patriarch Alexy II who was too ill at the time to travel to Yekaterinburg, assisted by Russian Orthodox clergy from all over the Russian Federation. In 2003, President Vladimir Putin and German Chancellor Gerhard Schröder met in Yekaterinburg and visited the church.

The Cross

On one side of the church, there is an Orthodox cross which marks the location of the Romanovs' deaths. Even during the Soviet era, there were crosses in that area but it changed over time. Different crosses were replaced by a new one as the years went by. A small wooden structure was eventually built behind the cross and stands near the church.

See also
Ganina Yama

Notes

References

Churches completed in 2003
Russian Orthodox church buildings in Russia
Buildings and structures in Yekaterinburg
Church buildings with domes
Nicholas II of Russia
Holy Blood churches